Stephanie's Image is a 2009 American drama film directed by Janis DeLucia Allen, written by J.P. Allen and featuring Melissa Leo in the title role.

Plot
A former model, Stephanie, is found murdered in her San Francisco apartment.  Her boyfriend, Richard, whose body is also found at the scene, apparently killed her and then committed suicide.  A photographer who worked closely with Stephanie decides to make a documentary about her life, a kind of memorial.  She interviews those people closest to Stephanie, but she soon discovers that almost everything she’s been told about the crime is false, and everyone she interviews is lying. The circumstances surrounding Stephanie’s death become more and more contradictory and as the filmmaker struggles to find the truth she also realizes she may have played a frightening part in what happened to her friend.

Festivals and awards 
Festivals - Official Selection
 NewFilmmakers, Los Angeles - February, 2009
 Method Fest Independent Film Festival - March, 2009
 Milan International Film Festival, Italy - May, 2009
 Lighthouse International Film Festival - June, 2009
 Washougal International Film Festival - August, 2009
 Charlotte Film Festival - September, 2009
 Ojai-Ventura International Film Festival - November, 2009

Nominations
 Milan International Film Festival 2009 - Best Feature Film
 Milan International Film Festival 2009 - Best Actress, Melissa Leo
 Milan International Film Festival 2009 - Best Editor, Janis Delucia Allen

Awards
 Washougal International Film Festival, 2009 - Audience Award, Best Feature film

Release
Stephanie's Image premiered at the Method Fest Independent Film Festival in March 2009 and played at several US festivals.  It also received multiple nominations at the 2009 Milan International Film Festival Awards including consideration for Best Feature Film.  The film had a very limited theatrical release on February 15, 2010.  It was released on DVD by Vanguard Cinema on February 23, 2010.

References

External links 

 Film News and Views

2009 films
2009 drama films
American drama films
2000s English-language films
2000s American films